Smokers Express (or Smokers Express Airlines) was a Cocoa Beach, Florida-based company that would have provided smoking flights to destinations within the United States.  Founded in 1993 by William Walts and George "Mickey" Richardson, the company never received enough funding to begin operations.

Concept
Upset not only by the non-smoking policy of most major airlines but also by the quality of other amenities such as food and in-flight entertainment, Walts conceived the idea of a "smokers airline".  His company would not only allow smoking on flights, but encourage it by handing out free cigarettes and "full-size" ashtrays during flight.  The airline also advertised free headsets (for listening to in-flight entertainment) and "real food for real people", which consisted of hamburgers, pizza, and steaks.

Because Federal Aviation Administration restrictions prohibit smoking on flights within the United States, Smokers Express was intended to be a membership-based airline.  Customers would have been required to join and pay a $25 yearly fee, and only persons age 21 or older would have been allowed to join. A side effect to this policy was a promise that the flights would be free of "screaming babies."

Aircraft
The company began by purchasing three McDonnell Douglas DC-9 aircraft, with the intention of leasing 27 additional DC-9s.
The aircraft would have been renovated with a high-volume air recirculation system, as well as improved flame-retardant carpet.

Routes
The airline originally intended to fly to 11 different destinations, adding more as additional funding enabled. The planned initial destinations were:
Las Vegas, Nevada
Dallas–Fort Worth, Texas
Houston, Texas
New Orleans, Louisiana
Oklahoma City, Oklahoma
Tulsa, Oklahoma
Newark, New Jersey
Atlantic City, New Jersey
Orlando, Florida
Titusville, Florida
Miami, Florida

The first flight would have taken place on August 16, 1993.

Company structure
Smokers Express was designed to be an employee-owned company.  It relied mostly on membership dues and ticket sales, however, no tickets were ever sold.  The company did not advertise directly, but relied on word-of-mouth, various articles and TV news references.  Despite what the company perceived as a positive response to their concept, it failed to raise enough funds to begin operations.

See also 
 List of defunct airlines of the United States

References 
Archived documents pertaining to Smokers Express

Airlines established in 1993
Defunct airlines of the United States
Smoking in the United States